Ursa Major B or 3C 244.1 is a radio galaxy located in the constellation Ursa Major.

It is classified as a Fanaroff-Riley Type II (FRII) radio source, which means that the luminosity increases with distance from the core. There are two, asymmetrical radio-emitting lobes straddling the parent galaxy. These lobes have an angular separation of 52″ at a position angle of 168°. When measured in the optical band, this galaxy has a redshift value of z = 0.428, corresponding to a distance of 1.5 Gpc. 3C 244.1 is located within a cluster of other galaxies.

Observations with the Hubble Space Telescope show an elliptical galaxy with blobs and a filamentary structure. The radio jets being generated by the active galactic nucleus are interacting with the interstellar medium, producing extended narrow line regions. These features are commonly associated with many active galaxies.  The axial ratio of the elliptical galaxy is 1.4, meaning it is about 1.4 times large along the primary axis than along the perpendicular axis.

At the nucleus of this galaxy is a supermassive black hole with an estimated  solar masses.

See also
 Lists of galaxies

References

External links
 www.jb.man.ac.uk/atlas/
 

Radio galaxies
Ursa Major (constellation)
244.1
+58.21
2821461